Lisa Tomblin is a film make-up department chief hairdresser.

On January 24, 2012, she was nominated for an Academy Award for the movie Harry Potter and the Deathly Hallows – Part 2. Her nomination was shared with Nick Dudman and Amanda Knight.

She is the daughter of the film producer, film director and assistant director David Tomblin.

References

External links

Living people
British make-up artists
Place of birth missing (living people)
Year of birth missing (living people)
British hairdressers